Deganwy railway station serves the town of Deganwy, Wales, and is the only intermediate station located on the Llandudno branch line from Llandudno Junction (on the North Wales Coast Line from Crewe to Holyhead) to Llandudno.

History
The station was built by the London and North Western Railway in 1866 together with adjacent wharfs on the Conwy Estuary to which it was planned to bring dressed slate from Blaenau Ffestiniog for export by sea. These wharfs have been redeveloped in the 21st century for housing and marina facilities. The station retains its signal box and semaphore signalling.

Facilities

The station buildings have been demolished and replaced by small shelters but arriving passengers must still cross the line by the original footbridge, which was refurbished in 2012. No ticketing facilities are provided, so passenger must buy tickets on the train or prior to travel. Train running information is offered via timetable posters and telephone. Step-free access to both platforms is available, though this requires the use of the station level crossing for Llandudno-bound passengers.

Services
There are hourly through services on weekdays to Manchester Piccadilly via Colwyn Bay, Abergele, Rhyl, Prestatyn, Flint, Shotton, Chester and Warrington

There are six trains per day running along the Conwy Valley Line calling at stations such as Llanrwst, Betws-y-coed as well as Blaenau Ffestiniog

Transport for Wales Rail also provide a regular shuttle between Llandudno, Deganwy and Llandudno Junction. Llandudno Junction serves as an interchange with good connections for services heading towards Bangor and Holyhead as well as services to Birmingham New Street, London and South Wales.

Sunday trains formerly only operated during the summer months (May timetable change until mid-September), but since the winter 2019 timetable change now run all year - these operate only as a shuttle between Llandudno & Llandudno Junction (except for three return trips over the Conwy Valley line) from 10.00am until mid-evening.

As of 11 December 2022, Deganwy station is no longer a request stop with all services now booked to stop.

Notes

Further reading

External links

Railway stations in Conwy County Borough
DfT Category F2 stations
1866 establishments in Wales
Railway request stops in Great Britain
Former London and North Western Railway stations
Railway stations in Great Britain opened in 1866
Railway stations served by Transport for Wales Rail